Their Mad Moment is a 1931 American pre-Code comedy drama film directed by Chandler Sprague and starring  Dorothy Mackaill, Warner Baxter and ZaSu Pitts. An uncredited Hamilton MacFadden also directed some scenes. It is based on the 1927 novel Basquerie by Eleanor Mercein Kelly. A Spanish-language version Mi último amor was also produced.

Synopsis
American Suzanne Stanley, short of money, takes her stepdaughter Emily to Biarritz in order to find her a wealthy husband. She pushes her towards the dull Englishman Sir Harry Congers, but Emily is drawn instead to a poor Basque boatman Esteban. She agrees to go with him to the mountains to meet his family, intending to live romantically for a few days to compensate for a lifetime with Sir Harry. She knows she cannot cope with the harsh, peasant life in the mountains, and slips away to Biarritz. He reappears on the day of the wedding and takes her away on a yacht for England, revealing that he has made a fortune in America.

Cast
 Dorothy Mackaill as Emily Stanley
 Warner Baxter as Esteban Cristera
 ZaSu Pitts as Miss Dibbs
 Nance O'Neil as Grand Mere
 Lawrence Grant as Sir Harry Congers
 Leon Janney as Narcio
 John St. Polis as Hotel Manager
 Nella Walker as Suzanne Stanley
 Mary Doran as Stancia

References

External links

1931 films
American black-and-white films
Fox Film films
American comedy films
1931 comedy films
Films directed by Hamilton MacFadden
Films set in France
Films based on American novels
1930s English-language films
1930s American films